The Church of St. John is a parish church under the authority of the Roman Catholic Archdiocese of New York, located at 3021 Kingsbridge Avenue, Bronx, New York City. The parish was established in 1877 and has had long ties with the Religious of Jesus and Mary as their main base in New York.

On November 2, 2014, the parish was merged with that of the Church of Visitation.

Parish history
Founded in the 1860s as a mission attached to a Yonkers parish, and later to the Jesuits of Fordham University (founded as St. John's College), Mass was originally celebrated in an old schoolhouse on Spuyten Duyvil Hill. Upon the 1869 founding of St. Elizabeth Parish in Fort Washington by the Rev. Cornelius O’Callaghan, St. John's became a mission of the Fort Washington parish. A St. John's Church was listed at 2911 Church Street, in 1892. In 1914, it was recorded, that the "Rev. Francis Xavier Kelly, successor to Farther O’Dwyer, is assisted by the Rev. Joseph MacCarthy."

A Mass in Spanish was inaugurated in 1971. In 1994, the Order of Augustinian Recollects was entrusted with the administration of the parish.

Buildings
In 1870, Rev. Henry A. Brann was appointed to take charge of the mission. During his 16-year pastorate, he purchased land and built a small timber-framed church, which was dedicated by John Cardinal McCloskey on December 4, 1877, establishing the parish of St. John. The Rev. Edward O’Gorman was appointed the first resident pastor where he remained for 18 years and during that time greatly increased the church's property holdings. Rev. O’Gorman “removed” the 1877 church in 1893 and there built half of the present church's basement at a cost of $21,000. The following pastor, the Rev. Daniel H. O’Dwyer, converted the old church in a well-equipped hall.
Rev. O’Dwyer erected the present church. “It is built after the Tudor style, and has a beautiful painting, a copy of Brumidi’s ‘Crucifixion,’ above the altar. The basement contains a chapel, hall, theater, club-rooms, and gymnasium.”

Pastors
 Rev. Cornelius O’Callaghan  (-1870)
 Rev. Henry A. Brann (1870-1886)
 Rev. Edward O’Gorman (1886-1904)
 Rev. Daniel H. O’Dwyer (1904-1909)
 Rev. Francis Xavier Kelly (1909-1935)
 Rev. Martin A. Scanlan (1935-1963)
 Rev. Louis A. Stryker (1963-1971)
 Rev. John T. Doherty (1971-1982)
 Rev. John F. Lacey (1982-1984)
 Rev. William J. Foley (1984-1994)
 Rev. Edward Fagan, OAR (1994-2000)
 Rev. Gerry Cosgayon, OAR (2000-2003)
 Rev. Edward Fagan, OAR (2003-2009) 
 Rev. Antonio 'Joy' Zabala, OAR (2009-Present)

Convent of Jesus and Mary at Kingsbridge
“The Convent of Jesus and Mary in Kingsbridge was founded in 1903, and is within the parish limits.” Several nuns had left the mother-house in Rome in 1902 to establish this congregation, which developed into a century of service at the church where more than 200 RJM sisters dedicated countless years of educational service to thousands of local Catholic boys and girls. Notable educators among the sisters were Mother Mary Catherine (Kenny), Mother Camillus and Mother Regis.

St. John’s Parish School
The parochial school is located on 3143 Kingsbridge Avenue.  In 1914, the existing school had an attendance of 73 boys and 114 girls, and was run by six sisters from the Convent of Jesus and Mary at Kingsbridge. In 1950, the Brothers of the Christian Schools took charge of the Boys' Department at the invitation of Monsignor Martin Scanlan; the building in which the school is currently housed was constructed in 1953. . For more than 20 years they continued to serve the parish until, with vocations declining, they withdrew. Memorable members of their community were Brothers Celestine George, first principal, Arthur Philip, renowned educator in numerous Bronx Parish schools and Adelbert Patrick, noted musician and choral director. Notable educators among the sisters were Mother Mary Catherine (Kenny), Mother Camillus and Mother Regis. As of 2011, the school was still affiliated with the Religious of Jesus and Mary, and had students enrolled from PreK-3 through Grade 8. The current principal is Mr Edward Higgins.

References

External links
 St. John-Visitation website

Roman Catholic churches in the Bronx
Gothic Revival church buildings in New York City
Private middle schools in the Bronx
Roman Catholic churches completed in 1877
Roman Catholic churches completed in 1893
Roman Catholic churches completed in 1904
New York City Designated Landmarks in the Bronx
Catholic elementary schools in the Bronx
Kingsbridge, Bronx
19th-century Roman Catholic church buildings in the United States
1860s establishments in New York (state)